Saturday Night Live premiered its fortieth season during the 2014–15 television season on NBC. The season premiered on September 27, 2014, with host Chris Pratt and musical guest Ariana Grande and came to a conclusion on May 16, 2015, with host Louis C.K. and musical guest Rihanna. Former cast member Darrell Hammond succeeded Don Pardo, who had died in August, as the show's new announcer. The premiere included an interstitial photograph of Pardo – SNLs announcer since it premiered in 1975 (with the exception of season 7 and episode 14 of season 21 – where Hammond took his place).

Cast
As part of an ongoing rebuilding process, which executive producer Lorne Michaels indicated would result in cast changes for the 2014–15 season, a number of those changes were announced prior to the start of the season. Longtime cast member Nasim Pedrad, who had been on the show for five seasons since 2009, announced her departure in June 2014, as she was to star on the Lorne Michaels-produced sitcom Mulaney.  Following Pedrad's departure, featured players John Milhiser, Noël Wells, and Brooks Wheelan were all let go following the finale, after only one season with the cast. Additionally, Mike O'Brien, a writer for the show for four seasons before joining the cast at the start of the previous season, returned to the writers' room for this season, which would be his last as a writer. Overall, of the eight cast members introduced during the previous season, only Beck Bennett, Kyle Mooney, Colin Jost, and Sasheer Zamata returned. Jost has remained a cast member on the show since season 39. Bennett would leave after season 46, Mooney would leave after season 47, and Zamata would leave after season 42.

To fill the void following Pedrad, Milhiser, O'Brien, Wells, and Wheelan's departures, two comedians joined the cast at the start of the season: stand-up comic Pete Davidson, the first SNL cast member to have been born in the 1990s, and former SNL writer Michael Che as a Weekend Update co-anchor, replacing Cecily Strong, who remained in the cast. Che left SNL at the end of the previous season to become a correspondent on The Daily Show. After making appearances on Weekend Update and in several sketches, writer Leslie Jones was promoted to the cast on October 20, 2014 as a featured player.

Coinciding with the show's fortieth anniversary, SNL introduced a new logo created by design firm Pentagram.

Cast roster

Repertory players
 Vanessa Bayer
 Aidy Bryant
 Taran Killam
 Kate McKinnon
 Bobby Moynihan
 Jay Pharoah
 Cecily Strong
 Kenan Thompson

bold denotes Weekend Update anchors

Featured players
 Beck Bennett
 Michael Che
 Pete Davidson
 Leslie Jones  (first episode: October 25, 2014)
 Colin Jost
 Kyle Mooney
 Sasheer Zamata

Writers

Prior to the start of the season, five new writers were hired:
Alison Rich, a performer with the Upright Citizen's Brigade in New York
Nick Rutherford, a member of Los Angeles-based comedy group Good Neighbor
Natasha Rothwell, a performer with the Upright Citizen's Brigade in New York
Streeter Seidell, CollegeHumor front page editor
Jeremy Beiler, writer on Inside Amy Schumer

This was the final season for Mike O'Brien, who joined the writing staff in 2009 and Claire Mulaney, who joined the staff in 2013, as well as the only season for writers Natasha Rothwell, Nick Rutherford, and Alison Rich.

Episodes

Specials

References

40
Saturday Night Live in the 2010s
2014 American television seasons
2015 American television seasons
Television shows directed by Don Roy King